Black ink, or India ink or Chinese ink, is a simple black or colored ink once widely used for writing and printing and now more commonly used for drawing and outlining.

Black ink may also refer to:

 Black Ink, album by American rapper Prozak
 Black Ink, subcommittee of Black Student Movement at University of North Carolina at Chapel Hill, U.S.

See also
Ink
Color printing
Black Ink Crew, an American reality television series 
Cephalopod ink, a dark pigment released into water by most species of cephalopod
Iron gall ink, a purple-black or brown-black ink 
White Ink, Black Ink, album by Wheat
Black Ink Collective, a former British publishing company founded in 1978